Bischofswerda is a small town in Germany at the western edge of Upper Lusatia in Saxony.

Geography

The town is located 33 km to the east of Dresden at the edge of the Upper Lusatian mountain country. The town is known as the "Gateway to Upper Lusatia" – "Tor zur Oberlausitz" in German. Located in the district of Bautzen, the town is 18 km west of Bautzen itself. Großdrebnitz is among its quarters. The river Wesenitz flows through the town.

History
The first documentary evidence of the existence of Bischofswerda dates from 1227. Nominally the town was founded by the Bishops of Meissen, though it may have existed before that point. In 1288 city walls were constructed. The first mention of Bischofswerda as a city is in a document dating from 1361. The town remained under the authority of the Bishops of Meissen until 1559 when power was transferred to Augustus, Elector of Saxony, who introduced Protestantism. The city arms are based on a 14th-century seal and consist of two crossed bishop's croziers and four stars. The significance of the stars is not known.

Like many late medieval towns, Bischofswerda suffered from periodic fires that damaged the town. Fires are recorded in 1429, 1469, 1528, 1583, 1596, 1641, 1671 and 1813. The last fire was the worst. During the War of the Sixth Coalition, Napoleonic forces had occupied Bischofswerda when a fire broke out within the town walls on 12 May 1813, destroying most of the medieval town. However the town was rebuilt on an order of Frederick Augustus I of Saxony in a manner closely following the earlier layout, and this remains to this day.

During the increased tensions of the 1980s between the Western democracies and the Eastern Communist Bloc, Bischofswerda became a base for Soviet SS-12 nuclear missiles. A depot for the missiles and their launchers was built just outside town.  The missiles were withdrawn in 1988.

The following table indicates Bischofwerda's population at different times:

 Source from 2000: Statistisches Landesamt Sachsen (Saxony Office of Statistics)

Sights
Among the most impressive buildings are the town hall and the Christuskirche. Both are examples of neo-classical architecture and were designed by Gottlob Friedrich Thormeyer. The town hall (Rathaus) was constructed in 1818, just off the Altmarkt, the centre of the town. The entrance to the Christuskirche is decorated by a mosaic by Josef Goller. In the interior one can find a painting by Osmar Schindler, who grew up in the town. The Catholic church is named after Saint Benno of Meissen, who is said to have founded Bischofswerda in the 11th century.

Economy and transport
Before the reunification of Germany in 1990, Bischofswerda was a significant industrial location. The company Fortschritt produced agricultural machines. This manufacture as well as the glass fabrication has closed. The textile industry had a centuries-long tradition in the town, but also ended in 2012.

New industries began to settle in Bischofswerda in recent years. Roth Industries, a German enterprise from the environmental technology sector, has a subsidiary here. The Canadian producer of solar cells, ARISE Technologies, came to the town, but has closed.

The town is situated on the Bundesstraße 6, which connects Dresden and Görlitz at the Polish border. The Bundesautobahn 4 bypasses the town 6 km north, enabling easy access to Dresden Airport. The road traffic bypasses the town in the west. Via Bischofswerda railway station, direct access by rail is possible to Dresden, Görlitz, Zittau as well as to Czech Liberec.

Culture and sports
The little town became known nationally when the local football club BSG Fortschritt Bischofswerda, sponsored by Fortschritt, twice reached the DDR-Oberliga, the highest football league in East Germany. Today, a modern open air bath and Saxony's littlest zoo can be noted. Regularly, the local festival Schiebocker Tage and a Karl May festival are organized.

Partnership
Bischofswerda is twin town of:
 Geislingen an der Steige
 Gryfów Śląski
 Raspenava
Moreover, a long-term partnership exists between organizations for the disabled in Bischofswerda and Eggenfelden.

Personality

Freemen
 1891: Otto von Bismarck
 1911: Heinrich Grafe (1857–1917), wine wholesalers, City Council Chairman and antisemitic Member of Reichstag 1893-1917

Sons and daughters of the town
 Christian Heckel (1676–1744), teacher, organist, musician, poet and publisher 
 Christian Adolph Klotz (1738–1771), philologist
 Karl Friedrich Bahrdt (1741–1792), theologian and enlightener

 Robert Heller (1812–1871), writer 
 Walther Hesse (1846–1911), microbiologist
 Max Neumeister (1849–1929), born in Kleindrebnitz, director of the Tharandt Forestry Academy
 Johannes Pache (1857–1897), composer
 Oskar Ernst Bernhardt (1875–1941), German founder of the Grail, writer
 Arthur Biram (1878–1967), philologist and philosopher 
 Günther Wyschofsky (born 1929), politician (SED), Minister for chemical industry in the GDR
Adeltraut Thienel - (1943 - ) Actress, Dressmaker, Designer,

Personalities who are associated with the city 
 Benno (1010–1106), bishop of Meissen
 Hanns Georgi (1901–1989), painter, director of a teacher training institute

Notes

External links

 Bischofswerda Official Website (German)
 Statistics of Bischofswerda, Germany (German)
 Karl Wilhelm Mittag. Chronik der königlich sächsischen Stadt Bischofswerda. Verl. Friedrich May Bischofswerda, 1861 Chronicle of the town, digitized
 Images of Bischofswerda at Europeana

Towns in Saxony
Populated places in Bautzen (district)
West Lusatia